Maol Muire Ó hÚigínn, also Maol Muire Ó Huiginn (Anglicised: Miler O'Higgin; died 1590 at Antwerp), was an Irish Catholic clergyman. A Franciscan, he was appointed Archbishop of Tuam by the Holy See on 24 March 1586, and died in office.

Ó hÚigínn was a son of Mathghamhain mac Maol Ó hÚigínn of Dougharane, Leyeny, County Sligo, a descendant of  Tadgh Óg Ó hÚigínn (died 1448). His brother was the poet Tadhg Dall Ó hÚigínn. Little is known of Ó hÚigínn's early life, but Tadhg Dall was fostered at Tír Conaill with the ruling Uí Domnaill family, and Maol Muire may have gone there with his brother. According to McGettigan, "A later source states that in his youth Maol Muire was an accomplished poet and harpist and also something of a philosopher."

Ó hÚigínn was educated on the continent, where he took degrees in canon law, civil law and theology. This high standard of education led to his consecration as Archbishop of Tuam in April 1586. He left for Rome sometime prior to 1590, possibly as a result of the severity of the rule of Richard Bingham. He was on his way back from Rome when he died at the episcopal palace at Antwerp on 5 August 1590, and was buried in the Cathedral of Our Lady within the city.

Some of Ó hÚigínn's poems are extant. One, on the uncertainty of life, begins its twelve verses: ,. Another, in praise of Ireland, is one hundred and thirty-six verses long. Its first line is: ,. Several other of his poems on religious subjects survive. Ó hÚigínn's poems were still known by poets and historians, and continued to be copied in manuscripts well into the 19th century.

References

Further reading
 CELTS - Corpus of Electronic Texts: The Free Digital Humanities Resource for Irish history, literature and politics. University College Cork - Coláiste na hOllscoile Corcaigh
 O hUiginn, Maol Muire (Miler O'Higgins), Darren McGettigan, in Dictionary of Irish Biography, pp. 574–75, Cambridge, 2009.

1590 deaths
Irish poets
People from County Sligo
Roman Catholic archbishops of Tuam
Irish expatriates in Belgium
Irish religious writers
16th-century Irish poets
Year of birth unknown
Irish-language writers